Henrik Bernburg (born 9 April 1947) is a Danish footballer. He played in two matches for the Denmark national football team from 1968 to 1970.

References

External links
 

1947 births
Living people
Danish men's footballers
Denmark international footballers
Place of birth missing (living people)
Association football midfielders
Akademisk Boldklub players
Kjøbenhavns Boldklub players